Uzuntala may refer to:
 Aygehovit, Armenia
Uzuntala, Qakh, Azerbaijan
Uzuntala, Zaqatala, Azerbaijan